The City of Stawell was a local government area about  west-northwest of Melbourne, the state capital of Victoria, Australia. Its area was surrounded by the separate and largely rural Shire of Stawell.

History

Stawell was incorporated as a borough on 12 November 1869, and became a town on 18 September 1957. It was proclaimed a city on 12 November 1989.

On 20 January 1995, the City of Stawell was abolished, and along with the Town of St Arnaud and parts of the Shires of Ararat, Avoca, Donald, Dunmunkle, Kara Kara, Stawell and the Grampians National Park section of the Shire of Wimmera, was merged into the newly created Shire of Northern Grampians.

Wards
The City of Stawell was at one stage divided into wards, but they were abolished on 27 January 1965, after which the twelve councillors represented the entire area.

Population

* Estimate in the 1958 Victorian Year Book.

See also
 List of mayors of Stawell

References

External links
 Victorian Places - Stawell

Stawell City
Stawell, Victoria